Cejpia is a genus of fungi in the family Dermateaceae. The genus, named in honour of Czech mycologist Karel Cejp, contains two species.

The genus was circumscribed by Josef Velenovsky in Monogr. Discom. Bohem. on page 125 in 1934.

See also
List of Dermateaceae genera

References

Dermateaceae genera
Dermateaceae